Tando Allahyar District  is a district in the province of Sindh in Pakistan. Prior to becoming a separate district, it was part of Hyderabad District.

History

The city of Tando Allahyar, was established with the construction of a fort by Mir Allahyar Khan Talpur in 1709. A large number of people seeking security and refuge moved to this area under the protection of the Mir, booming the trade in the region. As the city developed over the next decade, the area started to be known as Allahyar Jo Tando (Allahyar's Town).

The shrine of legendary Sindhi folk wisdom character and Sufi poet Watayu Faqeer is also situated in Kuba Shareef near Rashidabad.

In 1906 during the British Raj, a railway station was constructed in Allahyar Jo Tando. The station increased the district's importance as an agro-trading hub. Allahyar Jo Tando was then renamed to Tando Allahyar.

The British Raj brought the fort of Mir Allahyar under its official use. This fort is now known as the Kacho Qilo; however, some decorated walls from the times of Mir Allahyar Khan are still present. After the construction of the canal in 1933, the city of Tando Allahyar turned into agricultural heaven. Before 1947, the city had a large number of Hindu followers. The Ramapir Temple of Baba Ramdevji Rama-Pir was a symbol of Hindu-Muslim unity and peaceful co-existence. However, after the Indian Partition⁣, a number of Hindu followers took refuge in India. The temple still stands tall in the town center, attracting hundreds of pilgrims from all around the region. Tando Allahyar district was formed by dividing the Hyderabad district along with Matiari and Tando Muhammad Khan districts in 2005.

As of 2021, Tando Allahyar is a bustling overpopulated urban town; although it is ill-planned and lacks proper governance, the historic town still has much to offer to its residents and its ever-increasing new settlers. The city is the center a of Sunni Hanafi (preacher) and attracts many visitors each Friday night. It also had old village named, Khan Muhammad Bozdar, about 200 years old. This village has only 52 houses with only the Bozdar caste residing in it. There is also an Astana e Aalia near Jamia Samdia Masjid Tando Allahyar where the Khalifa namely Pir Akhtar Shaheeni Saifi of Pir Abu Saalim Saifi Naqshbandi teaches the lesson of Sufism.

Dr. Rashid Shar Baloch held the Social Awareness & Assistance Forum (SAAF) in the district, giving a new ideology for the village state and village banking to financially empower people and capacity enhancement. The philosophy of SAAF Sindh based on the rural development and urban enlightenment movement towards the cognitive development of behavior and approach.

Administration

The district is subdivided into the three tehsils which contain a total of 20 Union Councils:

Education 
District Tando Allahyar is ranked at the 92nd position in the education score index of the Pakistan District Education Rankings 2017 published by Alif Ailaan. The education score is composed of the learning score, retention score, and gender parity score. In the middle school infrastructure index, which focuses on the availability of basic facilities and the building condition, Tando Allahyar ranks 75th. However, there was a steep improvement in almost all infrastructure indicators in Tando Allahyar in the year 2016-2017 including more availability of electricity and drinking water, access to toilets, and better building conditions.

Using data from the Standardized Achievement Test (SAT) report published by the Sindh government in 2017, it was found in the "2013-2018 Five Years of Education Reforms in Sindh. Wins, Losses and challenges for 2018-2023." report that Tando Allahyar ranked 8th for student achievement in the language in grade 8. However, with a score of only 41.68, it is still below average. In grade 8, Tando Allahyar ranked at the 7th position for student achievement in maths and 6th position for science.

Administrative and infrastructure issues remain a hindrance for every child in district Tando Allahyar to access free and quality education. Issues reported by the residents via the Taleem Do! App complain of the lack of absenteeism of teachers, lack of basic facilities, and the prevalence of shelter-less schools and closed schools. Some citizens also appeal for their children to be educated in the regional language, Sindhi, rather than Urdu or English. The debate on whether basic education should be provided in the regional, national or official languages has been a point of debate in Pakistan for several years.

Agriculture 

Mangoes are abundantly cultivated in Tando Allahyar. It is one of the richest areas of the country in terms of agriculture. Cash crops such as sugarcane, wheat, onions and cotton are cultivated in majority. Besides, orchards are spread over hundreds of acres of land.

The farmers of Tando Allahyar play a vital role in the production of vegetables, which are supplied to Karachi. The city has one of the highest yields in the province as it produces the highest quantity of sugarcane, with around 50 to 60 million maunds of sugarcane worth of annual production.

Seed companies in Tando Allahyar 
 Advance Seed Corporation
 Super Haari Seed Corporation (Regd)
 Patan Seed Corporation (Regd).
TASCO SEED Corporation (Regd)
Hyefa Seed Corporation (Pvt.) Ltd.

Demography 
At the time of the 2017 census, Tando Allahyar district had a population of 838,527, of which 432,697 were males and 405,709 females. The rural population was 570,428 (68.02%) and urban 268,099 (31.97%). The literacy rate is 38.23%: 47.96% for males and 27.90% for females.

Religion

The majority religion is Islam, with 65.54% of the population. Hinduism (including those from Scheduled Castes) is practiced by 34.17% of the population. Hindus are nearly 40% in rural areas.

The district hosts one of the major Hindu pilgrimage centre in Pakistan, the Shri Ramdev Pir temple, whose annual festival is the second-largest Hindu pilgrimage center in Pakistan.

Language 

At the time of the 2017 census, 80.90% of the population spoke Sindhi, 8.50% Urdu, 3.53% Punjabi, 1.51% Balochi and 1.33% Saraiki as their first language.

Culture 

Tando Allahyar has rich Sindhi culture. Men clad themselves with the national style of dress called Shalwar Kameez having broader bottoms and traditional caps. Women clad with 'Gharara' or 'Parro' with bangles all the way up till shoulders.

Clogging Road side tea stalls with colleagues and friends is a favorite pastime for men.

List of Dehs
The following is a list of Tando Allahyar District's dehs, organised by taluka:

 Jhando Mari Taluka (38 dehs)
 Aelchi
 Bulghia
 Chhachharki
 Daro Sutah
 Daseeri
 Dhaghki
 Gahaiki
 Ghado
 Hadeki
 Halepotani
 Mashaikh Hothi
 Hingorani
 Hotki
 Kathari
 Kehi
 Khado
 Koraiki
 Koryani
 Langhano
 Mail
 Makhoro
 Missan
 Narahado
 Nelorai
 Nimro
 Noori
 Palhi
 Rajpari
 Rappar
 Roopah
 Sajnah
 Seharki
 Seharpur
 Sonhari
 Thebaki
 Vesarki
 Wagori
 Waryaso
 Tando Allahyar Taluka (24 dehs)
 Amri
 Bhanoki
 Bhatti
 Bukerani
 Dalki
 Daro Qubi
 Dhandh Shah
 Dhoro Lakhmir
 Ghab
 Gujjo
 Kamaro
 Khokhar
 Lakhyar
 Mareji
 Mehmoodani
 Nahiki
 Nasarpur
 Pak Singhar
 Reechhal
 Shaikh Moosa
 Sohna Bukera
 Tando Allahyar
 Wagodar
 Wasanki
 Chambar Taluka (29 dehs)
 Arraro
 Bail
 Buchar
 Chachh
 Chambar
 Chanbeerah
 Dhaloo
 Garho Sadar
 Jarki
 Jaryoon
 Jhole
 Kandiyari
 Kapaho
 Karyo Gulsher
 Landhi
 Larah
 Lootko
 Mangria
 Meerankhori
 Nagnah
 Noondani
 Saheki
 Sajarchang
 Sandki
 Sehajro
 Sutiyari
 Tarahdi
 Thull
 Wangi

References

Bibliography 

 
Districts of Sindh